BR-367 is a federal highway that begins in Santa Cruz Cabrália, Bahia and ends in Gouveia, Minas Gerais. The highway connects Porto Seguro in Bahia and Almenara and Araçuaí and Diamantina in Minas Gerais.

References

Federal highways in Brazil